The liuqin (Chinese: , pinyin: ) is a three, four or five -stringed Chinese mandolin with a pear-shaped body. The range of its voice is much higher than the pipa, and it has its own special place in Chinese music, whether in orchestral music or in solo pieces. This has been the result of a modernization in its usage in recent years, leading to a gradual elevation in status of the liuqin from an accompaniment instrument in folk Chinese opera, to an instrument well-appreciated for its unique tonal and acoustic qualities. The position of the instrument is lower than the pipa, being held diagonally like the Chinese ruan and yueqin. Like the ruan and unlike the pipa its strings are elevated by a bridge and the soundboard has two prominent soundholes. Finally, the instrument is played with a pick with similar technique to both ruan and yueqin, whereas the pipa is played with the fingers. Therefore, the liuqin is most commonly played and doubled by those with ruan and yueqin experience.

Historically, the liuqin was commonly made of willow wood (柳 liǔ literally meaning "willow"), while the professionals used versions constructed with a higher-quality red sandalwood or rosewood. In contemporary versions, however, the front board is made of tong wood (桐木) and for the reverse side, of red sandalwood, as comparable to historical types.

History
The liuqin has gone by various names, firstly the liuyeqin (柳葉琴), meaning willow-leaf-shaped instrument. This was the original term for the liuqin, which is visibly an abbreviation of the term liuyeqin. The other reference to the liuqin is the tu pipa (土琵琶), literally meaning unrefined pipa, because of the aforementioned diminutive size and resemblance of the liuqin to the pipa.

Throughout its history, the liuqin came in variations ranging from two (which only had a range of one and a half octaves) to four strings. However, the earliest precursor of the modern four-stringed version of the instrument appeared and experienced popularity during the Qing Dynasty . This version had two strings, and was only used for accompaniment purposes in traditional operas, as mentioned before.

The two-stringed liuqin remained in use for much of dynastic China from the Qing Dynasty until the late 20th century. With the modernization of traditional Chinese music in the 1970s, the four-stringed liuqin was developed as an improvement to its musical range, and the body of the instrument was enlarged to allow the player to handle the instrument with greater ease.

Playing technique, tones and range

Its technique is closer to that of the mandolin than that of the pipa, using a plectrum and frequently using the tremolo technique. Its strings are either tuned in fifths, G-D-A-E (as a mandolin or violin), or else in a mixture of fourths and fifths, as for example G-D-G-D, which is the more common tuning employed by mainstream players of the liuqin. This makes playing of the liuqin exactly the same as the zhongruan, which is tuned an octave lower, hence players of either the liuqin or the ruan can often double on both instruments.

The modern liuqin has four steel strings. Like the ruan, the number of the liuqin'''s frets was increased from 7 to 29 over the course of the 20th century. These frets are arranged in half-step intervals. Its refreshing and jubilant tonal quality is more delicate than that of the yueqin.

Note that the frets on all Chinese lutes are high so that the fingers never touch the actual body—distinctively different from western fretted instruments. This allows for a greater control over timbre and intonation than their western counterparts, but makes chordal playing (double, triple, quadruple stopping) more difficult.

Notable players of the liuqin
NiNi Music
Wang Hongyi (王红艺), daughter of Wang Huiran
Wang Huiran (王惠然, 1936-2023), esteemed "Father of the liuqin'"
Mei Han, guzheng who doubles on liuqin

Liuqin repertoire

composed/co-composed/adapted by Wang Huiran (王惠然)
Canal Works of Happiness
Melody on a Moonlit River
Sing a Mountain Song of Love
Spring Comes to River Yi (春到沂河)
The Lark (Yun Que) Romanian Folk Music
Warrior Suite

By other composers
Sword Dance (劍器)
Beyond the Horizons (天地星空)
Courtyard After The Rain (雨后庭院)

See also

Traditional Chinese musical instruments

Bibliography
 Yu Yunfei,"The transition of liuqin's characters", Jiao Xiang-Journal of Xi'an Conservatory of Music, Mar.2005,90-92;
 Wang Huiran,"The revolution of liuqin and its current situation", People's Music, May.2006,48-51.

References

External links

More information
On the instrument
Liuqin photographs (first row)
Liuqin
Liu Qin (a Mp3 recording available here as well)
Information on the liuqin (also includes information on other plucked-string instruments and notational description of instrumental tonal range)

On players of the liuqin
Concert information on Wang Huiran
Press release on Wang Hongyi
Information on Wang Huiran and Wang Hongyi

Audio
Liuqin Mp3s (click headphones to listen to individual tracks)
Liuqin Mp3s on Yahoo! GeoCities

Related Chinese plucked-string instruments
Pipa
Ruan

Chinese musical instruments
Necked bowl lutes